Dragutin Šurbek (8 August 1946 – 15 July 2018) was a Croatian and Yugoslav table tennis player and coach.

Career
Šurbek won two World Championship titles in the men's doubles event.  He won gold medals in 1979 (with Antun Stipančić) and in 1983 (with Zoran Kalinić). In the men's singles event, he won the bronze medal three times (in 1971, 1973 and 1981).

See also
 List of table tennis players
 List of World Table Tennis Championships medalists

References

External links
 
 
 Dragutin Surbek, the Lion of Zagreb, passes away

1946 births
2018 deaths
Croatian male table tennis players
Croatian table tennis coaches
Olympic table tennis players of Croatia
Sportspeople from Zagreb
Table tennis players at the 1992 Summer Olympics
Yugoslav table tennis players
Burials at Mirogoj Cemetery